Ernest Needham (21 January 1873 – 8 March 1936) was an English footballer and cricketer. He played in sixteen international football matches for England and captained the side in 1901.

He was an outstanding left half who played for Sheffield United from 1891 until 1910. He was instrumental in their promotion campaign of 1892–93 and then captained their team from 1895 to 1905. Under his captaincy, United won the Football League First Division in 1898 and the FA Cup in 1899 and 1902. 
 
He played first-class cricket for Derbyshire from 1901 to 1912.

Football career

Early career
Needham was born at Newbould Moor, Chesterfield. Having previously played as a forward for Waverley F.C. and Staveley Wanderers, Needham agreed to sign for United when they met his club, Staveley F.C., on 10 February 1891.

Sheffield United
Needham made his debut for the Blades on 5 September 1891, in a pre-season game against Woolwich Arsenal. Originally a right winger, injuries during his first season saw him move to left half.

Short yet solidly built and blessed with immense stamina, he was fast, resolute and brave. His consistently accomplished and energetic displays made him the star of the side and won him the title, 'the prince of half backs'. Writer Alfred Gibson made the following comments about Needham in 1906:
"There is one thing which has made Earnest Needham stand out of the common run of halves; he is neither a constructive nor a destructive half-back alone; he is both at once. One moment you will see him falling back to the defence of his own goal, or checking the speedy rush of his wing; the next, he is up with his forwards, feeding them to a nicety, and always making the best of every opening. Where he gets his pace from is a mystery. He never seems to be racing, yet he must be moving at racing pace; he never seems to be exhausted, yet in a big game he is practically doing three men's work."

A fine shot, Needham possessed great ball control: "This is one of the secrets of his greatness for very seldom when he has the ball is he deprived of it, whilst the accuracy of his wing passes, and the telling force of his punches straight across the field to an unprotected wing, spell danger to any kind of defence."

After 551 appearances, including 464 Football League games and 49 FA Cup ties, Needham retired from football. His final game for United came on 22 January 1910 against Bolton Wanderers, and with Needham having played in every season in the Football League that United had played, it marked the end of a golden era for the Blades that they have never since matched.

Although Needham was missed by his native club Derby County, his nephew George Wright Needham did play a few games for The Rams.

International career
Needham made his debut for England against Scotland in April 1894. He was an England regular for many years and the first Sheffield United player to captain the England national side. He represented England 16 times, and the Football League ten times.

Cricket career
Needham was a left-hand batsman who played 340 innings in 186 first-class matches. He scored 6550 runs at 20.15, including seven centuries with a top score of 159. He was an occasional wicket-keeper, and as a right-arm medium pace bowler bowled 21 overs without taking a wicket.

Before playing for Derbyshire, Needham is recorded playing in a match for Liverpool and District against Cambridge University in 1898. He made his debut for Derbyshire in June 1901 against a South African team, and scored 57 in his first innings but was out for a duck in the second. He played regularly every season until 1911. In 1903 he made his first century against Hampshire. He scored 47 in his one innings in the game at Chesterfield in 1904 when visitors Essex set an unwanted record by losing despite amassing 597 in their first innings. In 1907 Needham scored 119 against Hampshire and in 1908 scored three centuries. He scored 104 against Worcestershire and in one match against Essex scored 107 and 104, although this was not enough to stave off defeat. In 1910 he made his top score of 159 against Leicestershire and in 1911 he made 103 against Nottinghamshire. In 1912 he played only three games for Derbyshire.

Author
Needham wrote a ninety-page brochure titled "Association Football" which was published in 1901. From practical experience, Needham offered his own opinions on tactics and formation. It was well received upon publication. One periodical described it as a "valuable book by a practical expert."

Career statistics

Honours
Sheffield United
Football League Division One: 1897–98; runner-up: 1896–97, 1899–1900
Football League Division Two runner-up: 1892–93
 FA Cup: 1899, 1902; runner-up 1901

References

Bibliography
Needham, Ernest (1901). Association Football. Soccer Books Ltd. 
Clarebrough, Denis (1989). Sheffield United F.C., The First 100 years. Sheffield United Football Club. .
Young, Percy A. (1962). Football in Sheffield. Stanley Paul & Co Ltd. .

External links

1873 births
1936 deaths
English footballers
England international footballers
Sheffield United F.C. players
English cricketers
Derbyshire cricketers
Staveley F.C. players
Cricketers from Chesterfield, Derbyshire
Northern Football League players
English Football League players
English Football League representative players
Association football wing halves
FA Cup Final players